Wald may refer to the following municipalities in Switzerland:

Wald, Berne (Wald BE)
Wald, Appenzell (Wald AR)
Wald, Zurich (Wald ZH)

See also
Wald (disambiguation)